This is a partial listing of rivers in the state of Oregon, United States. This list of Oregon rivers is organized alphabetically and by tributary structure. The list may also include streams known as creeks, brooks, forks, branches and prongs, as well as sloughs and channels.

A list of rivers of the Americas and a list of Pacific Ocean coast rivers of the Americas are also available, as is a list of Oregon lakes.


Alphabetical listing

Abiqua Creek
Agency Creek (South Yamhill River)
Alsea River
Amazon Creek
Ana River
Applegate River
Ash Creek
Ashland Creek
Balch Creek
Bear Creek
Big Butte Creek
Big Marsh Creek
Big River
Birch Creek
Blue River
Breitenbush River
Bridge Creek (John Day River)
Buck Hollow River
Bull Run River
Bully Creek
Burnt River
Butte Creek
Calapooia River
Catherine Creek
Chetco River
Chewaucan River
Clackamas River
Clatskanie River
Clear Fork
Clearwater River
Coast Fork Willamette River
Collawash River
Columbia River
Columbia Slough
Coos River
Coquille River
Crabtree Creek
Crescent Creek
Crooked River
Cultus River
D River
Dead Indian Creek
Dead River
Deschutes River
Dog River
Donner und Blitzen River
Dry River
Dry Well Creek
East Fork Coquille River
East Fork Hood River
East Fork Quinn River
East Fork Salmon River
East Fork Silvies River
East Fork South Fork McKenzie River
Elk River
Elkhorn Creek
Fall River
Fanno Creek
Five Rivers
French Pete Creek
Gales Creek
Gilbert River
Grande Ronde River
Green River
Hood River
Illinois River
Imnaha River
John Day River (north central Oregon)
John Day River (Clatsop County)
Johnson Creek
Joseph Creek
Kellogg Creek
Kiger Creek
Kings River
Kilchis River
Klamath River
Klaskanine River
Lake Fork West Owyhee River
Lewis and Clark River
Link River
Little Applegate River
Little Blitzen River
Little Butte Creek
Little Chetco River
Little Clatskanie River
Little Deschutes River
Little Luckiamute River
Little Malheur River
Little Minam River
Little Nestucca River
Little North Santiam River
Little Owyhee River
Little Pudding River
Little River (Coast Fork Willamette River)
Little River (North Umpqua River)
Little Sandy River
Little Walla Walla River
Little Wallooskee River
Little Wildhorse Creek
Little Willamette River
Little Yaquina River
Long Tom River
Lookingglass Creek
Lost River
Lostine River
Luckiamute River
Malheur River
Marys River
McKenzie River
Metolius River
Metolius Springs
Miami River
Middle Fork Coquille River
Middle Fork Hood River
Middle Fork John Day River
Middle Fork Owyhee River
Middle Fork Rogue River
Middle Fork Willamette River
Middle Santiam River
Mill Creek
Miller Creek
Millicoma River
Minam River
Mohawk River
Molalla River
Muddy Fork
Multnomah Channel
Necanicum River
Nehalem River
Neskowin Creek
Nestucca River
New River
North Fork Alsea River
North Fork Breitenbush River
North Fork Bull Run River
North Fork Clackamas River
North Fork Coquille River
North Fork Crooked River
North Fork John Day River
North Fork Malheur River
North Fork Middle Fork Willamette River
North Fork Owyhee River
North Fork Siuslaw River
North Fork Smith River (Umpqua River)
North Fork Smith River (California)
North Fork Sprague River
North Fork Umatilla River
North Powder River
North Santiam River
North Umpqua River
North Yamhill River
Owyhee River
Pistol River
Powder River
Pudding River
Quartzville Creek
Red River
Roaring River (Clackamas River)
Roaring River (Crabtree Creek)
Roaring River (South Fork McKenzie River)
Rogue River (Oregon)
Rogue River (South Yamhill River)
Row River
Salmon River (Clackamas County, Oregon)
Salmon River (Lincoln County, Oregon)
Salmonberry River
Salt Creek (Middle Fork Willamette River)
Sandy River
Santiam River
Scoggins Creek
Shitepoke Creek
Shitten Creek
Siletz River
Siltcoos River
Silver Creek (Oregon)
Silvies River
Siuslaw River
Sixes River
Skipanon River
Smith River (McKenzie River)
Smith River (Umpqua River)
Snake River
South Fork Alsea River
South Fork Breitenbush River
South Fork Bull Run River
South Fork Burnt River
South Fork Clackamas River
South Fork Coos River
South Fork Coquille River
South Fork Crooked River
South Fork John Day River
South Fork Malheur River
South Fork McKenzie River
South Fork Roaring River
South Fork Rogue River
South Fork Salmon River
South Fork Sprague River
South Fork Umatilla River
South Santiam River
South Umpqua River
South Yamhill River
Succor Creek
Sprague River
Spring River (Deschutes River)
Spring River (North Umpqua River)
Steamboat Creek
Sycan River
Tenmile Creek (Coos County, Oregon)
Three Rivers
Tillamook River
Trask River
Treat River
Tualatin Sherman River
Tumalo Creek
Tumtum River
Umatilla River
Umpqua River
Walla Walla River
Wallooskee River
Wallowa River
Warm Springs River
Wenaha River
West Fork Hood River
West Fork Salmon River
West Fork Silvies River
West Fork Smith River
West Little Owyhee River
White River
Whitewater River
Whychus Creek
Wildcat Creek (Siuslaw River)
Wildhorse Creek
Willamette River
Williams River
Williamson River
Willow Creek
Wilson River
Winchuck River
Wind River
Wood River
Yachats River
Yamhill River
Yaquina River
Youngs River
Zigzag River

Listing by tributary structure

Pacific Ocean
List order is north to south if draining into the Pacific Ocean.  Tributary order is by increasing distance from the mouth of the river they feed.
Columbia River
Alder Creek
Tansy Creek
Skipanon River
Skipannon Slough
Old Skipannon Creek
Cullaby Lake
Cullaby Slough
Cullaby Creek
Youngs River
Lewis and Clark River
Knowland Slough
Craig Creek
Brown Creek
Crosel Creek
Wallooskee River
Little Wallooskee River
Cook Slough
Binder Slough
Casey Slough
Tucker Slough
Battle Creek Slough
Cooperage Slough
Klaskanine River
North Fork Klaskanine River
North Fork of the North Fork Klaskanine River
Middle Fork of the North Fork Klaskanine River
South Fork Klaskanine River
South Fork of the South Fork Klaskanine River
Moosmoos Creek
Wawa Creek
Bayney Creek
Rock Creek
Osgood Creek
Fox Creek
South Fork Youngs River
Fall Creek
John Day River
Jack Creek
Eskeline Creek
Marys Creek
Hillcrest Creek
Ferris Creek
Little Ferris Creek
Big Creek
Little Creek
Carmen Creek
Mill Creek
Pigpen Creek
Mud Creek
Coon Creek
Elk Creek
Fertile Valley Creek
Dogwood Creek
Clatskanie River
Beaver Slough
Fall Creek
Conyers Creek
Merril Creek
Perkins Creek
Keystone Creek
Langfeld Creek
Vonberg Creek
Miller Creek
Page Creek
Carcus Creek
North Fork
Falls Creek
Buck Creek
Little Clatskanie River
Multnomah Channel
Cunningham Slough
Scappoose Creek
Milton Creek
Perry Creek
Dart Creek
Cox Creek
Salmon Creek
Smith Creek
Apilton Creek
Salmonberry Creek
McNulty Creek
North Fork McNulty Creek
Warren Creek
Honeyman Creek
Sly Creek
Crooked Creek
Teal Creek
North Scappoose Creek
Deep Creek
Fall Creek
Alder Creek
Brush Creek
Cedar Creek
Lizzie Creek
Mollenhour Creek
South Scappoose Creek
Alder Creek
Coal Creek
Raymond Creek
Salt Creek
Mud Creek
Wolf Creek
Gourlay Creek
Lazy Creek
Dooly Creek
McLafferty Creek
Jackson Creek
Gilbert River
Mud Slough
Jack Slough
Ash Slough
Crane Slough
Joy Creek
Johns Creek
McCarthy Creek
Ennis Creek
Miller Creek
Gee Creek
Willamette River
Columbia Slough
Wilkes Creek
Fairview Creek
Osborn Creek
Doane Creek
Saltzman Creek
Rocking Chair Creek
Balch Creek
Tanner Creek
Stephens Creek
Lewis & Clark Ravine
Johnson Creek
Crystal Springs Creek
Veterans Creek
Kelley Creek
Mitchell Creek
Butler Creek
North Fork Johnson Creek
Sunshine Creek
Badger Creek
Kellogg Creek
Mount Scott Creek
Tryon Creek
Nettle Creek
Palatine Hill Creek
Red Fox Creek
Paget Creek
Park Creek
High Creek
East Fork Tryon Creek
Fourth Avenue Creek
Arnold Creek
Falling Creek
Oswego Creek
Springbrook Creek
Three Sisters Creek
Lamont Creek
Clackamas River
Eda Creek
Johnson Creek
Rock Creek
Clear Creek
Hattin Creek
Bargfeld Creek
Little Clear Creek
Mosier Creek
Tennys Creek
Swagger Creek
Little Clear Creek
Richardson Creek
Foster Creek
Deep Creek
Noyer Creek
North Fork Deep Creek
Doane Creek
Dolan Creek
Tickle Creek
South Fork Tickle Creek
Goose Creek
Eagle Creek
Currin Creek
Saling Creek
North Fork Eagle Creek
Bear Creek
Kasch Creek
Little Eagle Creek
Trout Creek
Delph Creek
South Fork Eagle Creek
Dubois Creek
Lingleback Creek
North Fork Clackamas River
Fall Creek
Bee Creek
Bedford Creek
Whiskey Creek
Boyer Creek
Dry Creek
South Fork Clackamas River
Memaloose Creek
Oscar Creek
East Fork of the South Fork Clackamas River
Moore Creek
Hellion Creek
Fish Creek
Murphy Creek
Roaring River
Grouse Creek
South Fork Roaring River
Shining Creek
Squaw Creek
Plaza Creek
Splintercat Creek
Cougar Creek
Pup Creek
Dinner Creek
Cat Creek
Deer Creek
Three Lynx Creek
Cripple Creek
Whale Creek
Sandstone Creek
Big Creek
Oak Grove Fork Clackamas River
Pint Creek
Station Creek
Butte Creek
Canyon Creek
Skunk Creek
Sam Creek
Kelley Creek
Cat Creek
Shellrock Creek
Peavine Creek
Buck Creek
Stone Creek
Anvil Creek
Dinger Creek
Cooper Creek
Crater Creek
Tag Creek
Trout Creek
Collawash River
Jack Davis Creek
Cap Creek
Sluice Creek
Slide Creek
Hot Springs Fork
Paste Creek
Farm Creek
Peat Creek
Buckeye Creek
Dickey Creek
Happy Creek
Blitzen Creek
Russ Creek
Jazz Creek
Dunno Creek
Elk Lake Creek
East Fork Collawash River
Switch Creek
Granite Creek
Lost Creek
Cabin Creek
Kansas Creek
Campbell Creek
Pinhead Creek
Wall Creek
Lowe Creek
Rhododendron Creek
Fawn Creek
Hunter Creek
Sisi Creek
Cub Creek
Lemiti Creek
Squirrel Creek
Tanner Creek
Tualatin River
Fields Creek
Wilson Creek
Shipley Creek
Pecan Creek
Athey Creek
Oswego Canal (outflow)
Saum Creek
Nyberg Creek
Hedges Creek
Fanno Creek
Ball Creek
Carter Creek
Red Rock Creek
Summer Creek
Ash Creek
Hiteon Creek
Woods Creek
Vermont Creek
Sylvan Creek
Bridlemile Creek
Ivey Creek
Spring Creek
Rock Creek
Chicken Creek
Cedar Creek
Goose Creek
Bell Road Creek
West Fork Chicken Creek
McFee Creek
Heaton Creek
Baker Creek
Fir Clearing Creek
Schmeltzer Creek
Ayers Creek
Graver Creek
Burris Creek
Messinger Creek
Christensen Creek
Butternut Creek
Gordon Creek
Rock Creek
Abbey Creek
Holcomb Creek
Beaverton Creek
Bronson Creek
Bannister Creek
Ward Creek
Willow Creek
Waterhouse Creek
Cedar Mill Creek
Johnson Creek
Johnston Creek
Messinger Creek
Hall Creek
Golf Creek
Dawson Creek
Davis Creek
Jackson Slough
Dairy Creek
McKay Creek
Storey Creek
Jackson Creek
Neil Creek
East Fork McKay Creek
Council Creek
East Fork Dairy Creek
Bledsoe Creek
Bausch Creek
Gumm Creek
Baker Creek
Big Canyon
Murtaugh Creek
Meadow Brook Creek
Plentywater Creek
Denny Creek
Rock Creek
Panther Creek
Roundy Creek
Campbell Creek
West Fork Dairy Creek
Lousignont Canal
Cedar Canyon Creek
Garrigus Creek
Kuder Creek
Whitcher Creek
Mendenhall Creek
Burgholzer Creek
Williams Creek
Cummings Creek
Gales Creek
Prickett Creek
Roderick Creek
Godfrey Creek
Kelley Creek
Clear Creek
Iller Creek
Fir Creek
Little Beaver Creek
White Creek
Lyda Creek
Bateman Creek
Beaver Creek
Coffee Creek
Finger Creek
South Fork Gales Creek
North Fork Gales Creek
Low Divide Creek
Dilley Creek
O'Neill Creek
Scoggins Creek
Sain Creek
Tanner Creek
Wall Creek
Parsons Creek
Fisher Creek
Wapato Creek
Hill Creek
Ayers Creek
Goodin Creek
Little Russell Creek
Black Jack Creek
Mercer Creek
Hering Creek
Roaring Creek
Patten Creek
Lee Creek
Sunday Creek
Maple Creek
Beaver Creek
Parrott Creek
Molalla River
Pudding River
Rock Creek
Bear Creek
Cedar Creek
Kaiser Creek
Garrett Creek
Thomas Creek
Butte Creek
Coal Creek
Little Coal Creek
Fall Creek
Looney Creek
Kirk Creek
South Fork Butte Creek
Fibre Creek
Rhody Creek
Fill Creek
Camp Creek
Zollner Creek
Little Pudding River
Carnes Creek
Lake Labish Ditch
Woods Creek
West Fork
Abiqua Creek
Powers Creek
Echo Creek
Hammond Creek
Goober Creek
Johnson Creek
Homestead Creek
Bucket Creek
Trinity Falls Creek
Wildcat Creek
Sweet Spring Creek
Silver Creek
Brush Creek
North Fork Silver Creek
Little North Fork Silver Creek
South Fork Silver Creek
Howard Creek
Smith Creek
Drift Creek
Gribble Creek
Dove Creek
Milk Creek
Woodcock Creek
Dickey Creek
Cedar Creek
Russell Creek
North Fork Molalla River
Trout Creek
Pine Creek
Shotgun Creek
Bear Creek
Cow Creek
Gawley Creek
Horse Creek
Table Rock Fork
Bull Creek
Avalanche Creek
Dungeon Creek
Minette Creek
Hay Barn Creek
Scorpion Creek
Lake Creek
Mining Iron Creek
Ogle Creek
Henry Creek
Newland Creek
Boeckman Creek
Coffee Lake Creek
Corral Creek
Mill Creek
North Fork Corral Creek
Middle Fork Corral Creek
South Fork Corral Creek
Ryan Creek
Champoeg Creek
Mission Creek
Case Creek
Murphy Creek
East Fork Champoeg Creek
West Fork Champoeg Creek
Spring Brook
High Water Slough
Chehalem Creek
Harvey Creek
Bryan Creek
Yamhill River
Palmer Creek
Henry Creek
Millican Creek
Hawn Creek
North Yamhill River
Panther Creek
Yamhill Creek
Rowland Creek
Salt Creek
Hutchcroft Creek
Turner Creek
Cedar Creek
Haskins Creek
Fairchild Creek
Petch Creek
Hanna Creek
Maroney Creek
Perkins Creek
South Yamhill River
Cozine Creek
Salt Creek
Deer Creek
Rock Creek
Mill Creek
Ash Creek
Willamina Creek
Tinkle Creek
Coast Creek
East Creek
Cedar Creek
Cockerham Creek
Doane Creek
Lady Creek
Gold Creek
Klees Creek
Casper Creek
Rowell Creek
Rock Creek
Rogue River
Agency Creek
Wind River
Elmer Creek
Crooked Creek
Cedar Creek
Ead Creek
Pierce Creek
Kitten Creek
Hanchet Creek
Lambert Slough
Eldridge Slough
King Creek
Spring Valley Creek
Glenn Creek
Mill Creek
Mill Race
Shelton Ditch
Battle Creek
Perrin Lateral
Beaver Creek
Porter Creek
Salem Ditch
North Fork Mill Creek
South Fork Mill Creek
Rickreall Creek
Hayden Slough
Oak Point Creek
McNary Creek
Baskett Slough
Mud Slough
McNary Branch
Goodwin Branch
McMahan Branch
Ellendale Creek
Canyon Creek
Applegate Creek
Skid Creek
Rockhouse Creek
Laurel Creek
South Fork Rickreall Creek
Fuller Creek
Ash Creek
South Fork Ash Creek
Middle Fork Ash Creek
North Fork Ash Creek
Rock Creek
Bashaw Creek
Miller Creek
Neil Creek
Luckiamute River
Soap Creek
Little Luckiamute River
Cooper Creek
Fern Creek
Teal Creek
Waymire Creek
Berry Creek
Dutch Creek
Sam's Creek
Black Rock Creek
Camp Creek
Lost Creek
Jont Creek
Dry Creek
Link Creek
McTimmonds Creek
Pedee Creek
Ritner Creek
Kinsey Creek
Clayton Creek
Love Creek
Sheythe Creek
Bump Creek
Maxfield Creek
Price Creek
Woods Creek
Plunkett Creek
Watson Creek
Vincent Creek
Burgett Creek
Alexander Creek
Bonner Creek
Jones Creek
Foster Creek
Hull Creek
Harris Creek
Slide Creek
Cougar Creek
Slick Creek
Rock Pit Creek
Wolf Creek
Miller Creek
Beaver Creek
Boulder Creek
Santiam River
Chehulpum Creek
Morgan Creek
North Santiam River
Smallman Creek
Logan Slough
Cold Creek
Valentine Creek
Alder Creek
Stout Creek
Trusk Creek
Little North Santiam River
Polly Creek
Cox Creek
Jeeter Creek
Beaver Creek
Kiel Creek
Canyon Creek
Bear Creek
Cougar Creek
Big Creek
Moorehouse Creek
Sinker Creek
Fish Creek
Elkhorn Creek
Buck Creek
Fawn Creek
Evans Creek
Henline Creek
Dry Creek
Little Cedar Creek
Cedar Creek
Stack Creek
East Stack Creek
Cold Creek
Tincup Creek
Horn Creek
Gold Creek
East Gold Creek
Opal Creek
Battle Ax Creek
Alder Creek
Manis Creek
Cherry Creek
Snake Creek
Rock Creek
Turnidge Creek
Mad Creek
Minto Creek
Packsaddle Creek
Bad Banks Creek
Niagara Creek
Sevenmile Creek
Little Washout Creek
Big Washout Creek
Little Sardine Creek
Big Sardine Creek
Mayflower Creek
Cumley Creek via Detroit Lake
Whitman Creek via Detroit Lake
M&M Creek via Detroit Lake
Heater Creek via Detroit Lake
Box Canyon Creek via Detroit Lake
Blowout Creek via Detroit Lake
Sauers Creek via Detroit Lake
Tumble Creek via Detroit Lake
Breitenbush River via Detroit Lake
North Fork Breitenbush River
Rapidan Creek
Mink Creek
South Fork North Fork Breitenbush River
South Fork Breitenbush River
Lake Creek
Mackey Creek via Detroit Lake
Hansen Creek via Detroit Lake
Dry Creek via Detroit Lake
Tom Creek via Detroit Lake
Loy Creek via Detroit Lake
Boulder Creek
Cabin Creek
Rainbow Creek
McCoy Creek
Bear Lake Creek
Marys Creek
Misery Creek
Tunnel Creek
Spring Creek
Whitewater Creek
Pamelia Creek
Woodpecker Creek
Minto Creek
Bruno Creek
Marion Creek
Horn Creek
Bugaboo Creek
Parkett Creek
Downing Creek
Straight Creek
Lynx Creek
Camp Creek
Swede Creek
South Santiam River
Mill Creek
Thomas Creek
Sucker Slough
Mill Creek
South Fork
Jordan Creek
Criminal Creek
Indian Prairie Creek
Ella Creek
Hall Creek
Crabtree Creek
Beaver Creek
Roaring River
Milky Fork
Church Creek
Hunter Creek
Green Mountain Creek
Rock Creek
Bald Peter Creek
South Fork Crabtree Creek
Dorgan Creek
White Rock Creek
Bonnie Creek
Spring Branch
Onehorse Creek
Hamilton Creek
McDowell Creek
Roaring Creek
Ames Creek
Wiley Creek
Gadney Creek
Ralston Creek
Middle Santiam River
Lewis Creek
Coal Creek
Alder Creek
Little Bottom Creek
Green Peter Creek
Thistle Creek
Rumbaugh Creek
Whitcomb Creek
Quartzville Creek
Fool's Canyon
Moose Creek
Trout Creek
Panther Creek
Four Bit Creek
Yellowstone Creek
Boulder Creek
Packers Gulch
Yellowbottom Creek
Canal Creek
Dry Gulch
Beverly Creek
Cedar Creek
Elk Creek
Galena Creek
Savage Creek
Green Creek
Gold Creek
McQuade Creek
Gregg Creek
Little Meadow Creek
Beabe Creek
Freezeout Creek
Bruler Creek
Butte Creek
Tally Creek
Cave Creek
Knickerbocker Creek
Elk Creek
Maple Creek
Crash Creek
Cougar Creek
Twin Falls Creek
Bear Creek
Sixes Creek
Chimney Creek
Fitt Creek
Egg Creek
Jude Creek
Donaca Creek
Pyramid Creek
Bachelor Creek
South Pyramid Creek
Lake Creek
Holman Creek
Cougar Creek
Shot Pouch Creek
Deer Creek
Mouse Creek
Bucksnort Creek
Cabin Creek
Soda Creek
Dobbin Creek
Wolf Creek
Canyon Creek
Moose Creek
Falls Creek
Trout Creek
Little Boulder Creek
Boulder Creek
Keith Creek
Stewart Creek
Soda Fork
Elk Creek
Sheep Creek
Three Creek
Squaw Creek
Sevenmile Creek
Calapooia River
Oak Creek
Lake Creek
Butte Creek
Warren Creek
Brush Creek
Sawyer Creek
Pugh Creek
Cedar Creek
Sweet Honey Creek
Fox Creek
Bigs Creek
Blue Creek
McKinley Creek
Washout Creek
Barrett Creek
Potts Creek
King Creek
North Fork Calapooia River
United States Creek
Treadwall Creek
Keeney Creek
East Fork Keeney Creek
West Fork Keeney Creek
Eighteen Creek
Little Willamette River
Coon Creek
Bowers Slough
Dead River
Owl Creek
Marys River
Oak Creek
Lamprey Creek
Mulkey Creek
Skunk Creek
Alder Creek
Squaw Creek
Muddy Creek
Newton Creek
Greasy Creek
Woods Creek
Blakesley Creek
Read Creek
La Bare Creek
Gellatly Creek
Tumtum River
Norton Creek
Devitt Creek
East Fork Marys River
West Fork Marys River
Muddy Creek
Little Muddy Creek
Dry Muddy Creek
Long Tom River
Miller Creek 
Shafer Creek
Ferguson Creek
Amazon Creek
Bear Creek
Lingo Slough
Squaw Creek
Inman Creek at Fern Ridge Reservoir
Coyote Creek at Fern Ridge Reservoir
Spencer Creek
Sturtevant Creek
Battle Creek
Nighswander Creek
Jordan Creek
Health Springs Branch
Hayes Branch
Powell Creek
Beaver Creek
Bear Creek
Fox Hollow
Preacher Creek
Doak Creek
Jackson Creek
Rebel Creek
Hannavan Creek at Fern Ridge Reservoir
Indian Creek
Wilson Creek
Noti Creek
Gold Creek
Green Creek
Sweet Creek
Hayes Creek
Board Creek
Dusky Creek
Swamp Creek
Jones Creek
Michaels Creek
Ingram Slough
Curtis Slough
Spring Creek
McKenzie River
Mohawk River
Sister Creek
Stafford Creek
Spores Creek
Alder Branch
McGowan Creek
Parsons Creek
Cartwright Creek
Mill Creek
Wolf Creek
Oshkosh Creek
Deer Creek
Nebo Creek
Straight Creek
Polly Creek
Shotgun Creek
Drury Creek
Bette Creek
Log Creek
North Fork Mohawk River
South Fork Mohawk River
Blue River
Simmond Creek
Quartz Creek via Blue River Reservoir
North Fork Quartz Creek via Blue River Reservoir
Scott Creek via Blue River Reservoir
Lookout Creek
McRae Creek
Nostoc Creek
Saddle Creek
Mack Creek
Mona Creek
Tidbits Creek
Ore Creek
Flunky Creek
Cook Creek
Quentin Creek
Slipout Creek
Mann Creek
Wolf Creek
South Fork McKenzie River
East Fork South Fork McKenzie River
Walker Creek
Tipsoo Creek
French Pete Creek
Pat Creek
Olallie Creek
Roaring River
Moss Creek
McBee Creek
Horse Creek
West Fork Horse Creek
Drury Creek
Taylor Creek
East Fork Horse Creek
King Creek
Owl Creek
Wilelada Creek
Cedar Swamp Creek
Avenue Creek
Spring Creek
Halfinger Creek
Separation Creek
Castle Creek
Roney Creek
Pothole Creek
Mosquito Creek
Eugene Creek
Lost Creek
White Branch
Smith River
Bunchgrass Creek
Browder Creek
Gate Creek
Dodson Slough
Dedrick Slough
Coast Fork Willamette River
Bear Creek
Gettings Creek
Row River
Mosby Creek
Champion Creek
Kizer Creek
Perkins Creek
Smith Creek
Kennedy Creek
Fall Creek
Short Creek
Blue Creek
Simpson Creek
Lewis Creek
Rock Creek
Palmer Creek
Cow Creek
Clearing Creek
Cedar Creek
Allen Creek
Stell Creek
Bark Shanty Creek
Dry Creek
Little Dry Creek
Dahl Creek
Norwegian Creek
Gray Creek
Shea Creek
Brownie Creek
Lilly Creek
Tones Creek
Miles Creek
Tom Creek
Cove Creek
West Fork Mosby Creek
East Fork Mosby Creek
Hann's Creek
Baker Creek
Rat Creek
Bluff Creek
Smith Creek
Vaughn Creek
Anderson Creek
King Creek
Pitcher Creek
Cedar Creek
Hawley Creek
Culp Creek
Sharps Creek
Boulder Creek
Damewood Creek
Table Creek
Pony Creek
Staples Creek
Lick Creek
Buck Creek
Walker Creek
White Creek
Martin Creek
Sailors Creek
Fairview Creek
Judson Rock Creek
Bohemia Creek
Hunt Creek
Gleason Creek
Layng Creek
Brice Creek
Big River
Martin Creek
Bar Creek
Edward Creek
Boulder Creek
Box Canyon
Little River
Dennis Creek
Blood Creek
Garoutte Creek
Carlson Creek
Trail Creek
Cinnabar Creek
Weyerhaeuser Creek
Middle Fork Willamette River
Pudding Creek
Wallace Creek
Hills Creek
Rattlesnake Creek
Alder Creek
Fall Creek
Little Fall Creek
Norton Creek
Sturdy Creek
Winberry Creek via Fall Creek Lake
Nelson Creek
Alder Creek
Brush Creek
North Fork Winberry Creek
Minnehaha Creek
Blanket Creek
Traverse Creek
South Fork Winberry Creek
Monterica Creek
Cabin Creek
North Fork Fall Creek
Little Gold Creek
Boundary Creek
Timber Creek
Slick Creek
Bedrock Creek
Andy Creek
Portland Creek
Bubble Creek
Gales Creek
Logan Creek
PK Creek
Jones Creek
Puma Creek
Alder Creek
Zog Creek
Gibraltar Creek
Small Creek
Hehe Creek
Sunshine Creek
Pernot Creek
Marine Creek
Tiller Creek
Pacific Creek
Gold Creek
Ninemile Creek
Delp Creek
Saturn Creek
Platt Creek
Platt Creek
Briem Creek
Buzzard Creek
Lost Creek
Wagner Creek
Anthony Creek
Middle Creek
Carr Creek
Gossage Creek
East Gossage Creek
Guiley Creek
Noisy Creek (via Dexter Reservoir)
Minnow Creek (via Lookout Point Reservoir)
Rolling Riffle Creek (via Lookout Point Reservoir)
Hazel Creek (via Lookout Point Reservoir)
Bannister Creek (via Lookout Point Reservoir)
Fern Creek (via Lookout Point Reservoir)
Goodman Creek (via Lookout Point Reservoir)
Crale Creek (via Lookout Point Reservoir)
Rhodes Creek (via Lookout Point Reservoir)
School Creek (via Lookout Point Reservoir)
Cain Creek (via Lookout Point Reservoir)
Harper Creek (via Lookout Point Reservoir)
Armet Creek (via Lookout Point Reservoir)
North Creek (via Lookout Point Reservoir)
South Creek (via Lookout Point Reservoir)
Schweitzer Creek (via Lookout Point Reservoir)
Carpet Hill Creek (via Lookout Point Reservoir)
Duval Creek (via Lookout Point Reservoir)
Hospital Creek
Rock Creek
Whitehead Creek
Tire Creek
Bridge Creek
Buckhead Creek
Dell Creek
Deception Creek
North Fork Middle Fork Willamette River
Chillo Creek
Spot Creek
Gray Creek
Shortridge Creek
Salmon Creek
Salt Creek
Hills Creek (via Hills Creek Reservoir)
TNT Creek
Larlson Creek (via Hills Creek Reservoir)
Modoc Creek (via Hills Creek Reservoir)
Packard Creek (via Hills Creek Reservoir)
Bull Creek (via Hills Creek Reservoir)
Stony Creek (via Hills Creek Reservoir)
Little Willow Creek (via Hills Creek Reservoir)
Big Willow Creek (via Hills Creek Reservoir)
Coffeepot Creek (via Hills Creek Reservoir)
Snow Creek (via Hills Creek Reservoir)
Windfall Creek
Gold Creek
Buck Creek
Cone Creek
Bills Creek
Bohemia Creek
Estep Creek
Fy Creek
Snake Creek
Butcherknife Creek
Boulder Creek
Spring Butte Creek
Dry Creek
Indian Creek
What Creek
Youngs Creek
Coal Creek
Jims Creek
Deadhorse Creek
Gravel Creek
Simpson Creek
Maple Creek
Staley Creek
Echo Creek
Mac Creek
Swift Creek
Skunk Creek
Found Creek
Indigo Creek
Fizz Creek
Royal Creek
Tumblebug Creek
Beaver Creek
Sandy River
Beaver Creek
Big Creek
Buck Creek
Gordon Creek
Trout Creek
Bear Creek
Walker Creek
Bull Run River
Deer Creek 
Laughing Water Creek
Bowman Creek
Little Sandy River
Sievers Creek
Arrow Creek
Bow Creek
South Fork Bull Run River
Cedar Creek
Fox Creek
Camp Creek
Bear Creek
Cougar Creek
Deer Creek
North Fork Bull Run River
Fir Creek
Falls Creek
West Branch Falls Creek
Log Creek
Blazed Alder Creek
County Creek
Nanny Creek
Bedrock Creek
Hickman Creek
Cedar Creek
Beaver Creek
Badger Creek
Whisky Creek
Alder Creek
Spring Creek
Wildcat Creek
Little Joe Creek
Salmon River
Boulder Creek
Cheeney Creek
South Fork Salmon River
Mack Hall Creek
Bighorn Creek
Goat Creek
Kinzel Creek
Iron Creek
Tumbling Creek
Linney Creek
Draw Creek
String Creek
Wolf Creek
Fir Tree Creek
Mud Creek
Ghost Creek
East Fork Salmon River
West Fork Salmon River
North Boulder Creek
Hackett Creek
Zigzag River
Clear Fork
Horseshoe Creek
Lost Creek
Muddy Fork
Rushing Water Creek
Rainbow Creek
Latourell Creek
Young Creek
Henderson Creek
Bridal Veil Creek
Donahue Creek
Coopey Creek
Wahkeena Creek
Multnomah Creek
Oneonta Creek
Horsetail Creek
Tumalt Creek
McCord Creek
Moffett Creek
Hamilton Island Reach
Tanner Creek
Eagle Creek
Sorenson Creek
Tish Creek
Opal Creek
Wy'East Creek
East Fork Eagle Creek
Ruckel Creek
Moody Creek
Dry Creek
Herman Creek
Little Herman Creek
Camp Creek
East Fork Herman Creek
Casey Creek
Hazel Creek
Slide Creek
Mullinix Creek
Whisky Creek
Grays Creek
Gorton Creek
Harphan Creek
Summit Creek
Lindsey Creek
Warren Creek
Wonder Creek
Cabin Creek
Starvation Creek
Viento Creek
Perham Creek
Mitchell Creek
Phelps Creek
Flume Creek
Henderson Creek
Hood River
Indian Creek
Cedar Creek
Whiskey Creek
Neal Creek
Lenz Creek
Shelly Creek
Shelley Creek
West Fork Neal Creek
Snakehead Creek
Beaver Creek
Odell Creek
Spring Creek
Ditch Creek
Pine Creek
South Pine Creek
Cedar Branch
Collins Creek
West Fork Hood River
East Fork Hood River
Dog River
Middle Fork Hood River
Deschutes River
Elder Creek
Winterwater Creek
White River
Oak Springs Creek
Spring Creek
Bakeoven Creek
Wapinitia Creek
Nena Creek
Eagle Creek
Cove Creek
Antoken Creek
Oak Creek
Skookum Creek
Swamp Creek
Warm Springs River
Beaver Creek
Butte Creek
Mill Creek
Badger Creek
South Fork Warm Springs River
Bunchgrass Creek
Dry Creek
Trout Creek
Shitike Creek
Campbell Creek
Dry Hollow
Willow Creek
Dry Canyon
McMeen Creek
Newbill Creek
Coon Creek
Higgins Creek
Metolius River
Whitewater River
Metolius Springs
Crooked River
Dry River
Ochoco Creek
Mill Creek
Polly Creek
Lawson Creek
Veasle Creek
Salmon Creek
Camp Branch
Wolf Creek
Duncan Creek
Douthit Creek
Garden Creek
Metal Creek
Coyle Creek
Canyon Creek
Fisher Creek
Judy Creek
McAllister Creek
Aholt Creek
Camp Creek
North Fork Crooked River
South Fork Crooked River
Twelvemile Creek
Sand Hollow Creek
Buck Creek
Beaver Creek
Drift Canyon
Profanity Gulch
Alkali Creek
Paulina Creek
Wolf Creek
Grindstone Creek
Sugar Creek
Whychus Creek
Tumalo Creek
Spring River
Little Deschutes River
Paulina Creek
Crescent Creek
Big Marsh Creek
Hemlock Creek
Spruce Creek
Rabbit Creek
Swamp Creek
Basin Creek
Clover Creek
Burn Creek
Fall River
Indian Creek
Deer Creek
Cultus Creek
Cultus River
Snow Creek
John Day River
Rock Creek
Thirtymile Creek
Dry Fork Thirtymile Creek
East Fork Thirtymile Creek
Lost Valley Creek
Salmon Fork Thirtymile Creek
Searcy Creek
Little Searcy Creek
Bridge Creek
North Fork John Day River
Middle Fork John Day River
South Fork John Day River
Umatilla River
Butter Creek
Birch Creek
North Fork Umatilla River
Coyote Creek
Woodward Creek
Johnson Creek
South Fork Umatilla River
Buck Creek
Thomas Creek
Shimmiehorn Creek
Walla Walla River
Snake River
Grande Ronde River 
Wenaha River 
Crooked Creek
Burnt Canyon Creek
Fairview Creek
Cross Canyon
Weller Creek
Swamp Creek
Butte Creek
Big Hole Canyon
Rock Creek
Slick Ear Creek
Beaver Creek
North Fork Wenaha River
Deep Saddle Creek
South Fork Wenaha River
Elk Creek
Jaussard Creek
Cougar Canyon
Trapper Creek
Milk Creek
Wallowa River 
Howard Creek
Wise Creek
Fisher Creek
Minam River 
Squaw Creek
Gunderson Creek
Cougar Creek
Trout Creek
Murphy Creek
Eagle Creek
Lobo Creek
Faun Creek
Little Minam River
Black Creek
Grouse Creek
Big Canyon
Boulder Creek
Huckleberry Creek
Threemile Creek
Grizzly Creek
Horseshoe Creek
Fireline Creek
Dobbin Creek
Horse Basin Creek
Horseheaven Creek
Wallowa Creek
Chaparral Creek
Whoopee Creek
Garwood Creek
Threemile Creek
Jerry Creek
Little Pot Creek
North Minam River
Pot Creek
Pole Creek
Lackey Creek
Rock Creek
Cap Creek
Last Chance Creek
Elk Creek
Granite Gulch
Wild Sheep Creek
Lowry Gulch
Trail Creek
Pop Creek
Deer Creek
Sage Creek
Rock Creek
Dry Creek
Spring Creek
Boyd Creek
Bear Creek
Little Bear Creek
Doc Creek
Fox Creek
Goat Creek
McCubbin Creek
Dobbin Creek
Lake Basin Creek
Saddle Basin Creek
Blowout Basin Creek
Twin Basin Creek
Miner Basin Creek
Granite Creek
Lostine River 
Lookingglass Creek 
Catherine Creek
Mill Creek
McAlister Slough
Ladd Creek
Little Creek
Pyles Creek
Little Catherine Creek
Milk Creek
Scout Creek
North Fork Catherine Creek
South Fork Catherine Creek
Imnaha River 
Toomey Gulch
Trough Gulch
Vance Draw
Cow Creek
Lightning Creek
Tulley Creek
Corral Creek
Little Basin Creek
Buck Creek
Packsaddle Creek
Kettle Creek
Log Creek
Fall Creek
Fence Creek
Bare Creek
Burcher Canyon
Weaver Canyon
Bailey Canyon
Adams Canyon
Sheep Creek
Deer Creek
High Camp Creek
Dead Horse Creek
Rippleton Creek
Dunlap Creek
Thorn Creek
Jody Creek
Keeler Creek
Loyd Creek
Snell Creek
Spring Creek
Schleur Creek
Adams Creek
College Creek
Double Creek
Blackmore Creek
Turner Creek
Indian Creek
Freezeout Creek
Dunn Creek
Campbell Creek
Chalk Creek
Beeler Creek
Park Creek
Winston Creek
Line Creek
Balter Creek
Musty Creek
Grouse Creek
Shin Creek
Johnson Creek
Neil Canyon
Trail Creek
Leggett Creek
Grizzly Creek
Keener Gulch
Henry Creek
Crazyman Creek
Spring Creek
Nine Point Creek
Mahogany Creek
Gumboot Creek
Blackhorse Creek
Dry Creek
Beaverdam Creek
Skookum Creek
Rock Creek
Deadman Canyon
South Fork Imnaha River
North Fork Imnaha River
Powder River 
Timber Canyon
Little Timber Canyon
Foster Gulch
Ruth Gulch
Long Hollow
Daly Creek
Squaw Creek
Spring Creek
Cherry Spring Creek
Eagle Creek
Summit Creek
Barnard Creek
Skull Creek
Town Gulch
Trouble Creek
Little Eagle Creek
Holcomb Creek
Six Dollar Gulch
Shanghai Creek
Puzzle Creek
Dempsey Creek
Basin Creek
Empire Gulch
Paddy Creek
Torchlight Gulch
Blue Canyon
East Fork Eagle River
Bradley Creek
O'Brien Creek
Bennet Creek
Dixie Creek
Excelsior Gulch
Skookum Creek
West Eagle Creek
Two Color Creek
Little Boulder Creek
Boulder Creek
Copper Creek
Bench Canyon
Cached Creek
Myers Gulch
Kirby Creek
Chalk Creek
Rock Gulch
Waterbury Gulch
Deep Gulch
Deer Gulch
Three Canyon
Reed Gulch
Lower Timber Canyon
Goodwin Gulch
Upper Timber Gulch
Canyon Creek
Rattlesnake Gulch
Maiden Gulch
Hole-in-the-Wall Gulch
Murray Gulch
Rich Creek
Pittsburgh Gulch
Corral Gulch
Crystal Palace Gulch
Fivemile Creek
Bacher Creek
Spring Creek
Love Creek
Goose Creek
Ritter Creek
Balm Creek
Bulldozer Creek
Clover Creek
Ruckles Creek
Tucker Creek
Table Creek
Houghton Creek
Crews Creek
Salt Creek
Big Creek
Magpie Creek
Cusick Creek
Antelope Creek
Jimmy Creek
Wolf Creek
North Powder River
Pilcher Creek
Anthony Creek
Gorham Gulch
Little Antone Creek
Antone Creek
Dutch Flat Creek
Lawrence Creek
Jimmy Creek
Twin Mountain Creek
North Fork North Powder River
Horse Creek
Warms Springs Creek
Gentry Creek
Muddy Creek
Sand Creek
Fish Creek
Rock Creek
Willow Creek
Pine Creek
Old Settlers Slough
Baldock Slough
Sutton Lodge Creek
Shaffner Creek
Timber Gulch
Spring Creek Gulch
Juniper Gulch
Beaver Creek
Blue Canyon
Trail Creek
Rancheria Creek
Donny Creek
Lake Creek
Poker Creek
Sheep Creek
California Gulch
Union Creek
Bridge Creek
Dean Creek
Smith Creek
Miners Creek
Crevice Creek
Clear Creek
Cook Gulch
Worley Creek
Hawley Gulch
Huckleberry Creek
Bear Gulch
Spruce Gulch
Sawmill Gulch
Cracker Creek
McCully Fork
Burnt River 
Durbin Creek
Cavenaugh Creek
Goodman Creek
Marble Creek
Bragg Creek
Jett Creek
Powell Creek
Reiber Creek
Dixie Creek
Chimney Creek
Jordan Creek
Sisley Creek
Swayze Creek
Pritchard Creek
Powell Creek
Sinker Creek
Deer Creek
Cave Creek
Clarks Creek
Marble Creek
Auburn Creek
McClellan Creek
Mahogany Creek
Stack Creek
Koontz Creek
Mill Creek
Garnet Creek
Steep Creek
Reed Creek
Indian Creek
Pine Creek
Deer Creek
Independence Creek
Flint Creek
Big Creek
Rock Creek
Camp Creek
Beaverdam Creek
Pine Creek
North Fork Burnt River
West Fork Burnt River
Middle Fork Burnt River
South Fork Burnt River
Powell Gulch
Pole Creek
Bullrun Creek
Steep Creek
Amelia Creek
Barney Creek
Stevens Creek
Rail Gulch
Elk Creek
Spring Creek
Bear Creek
Lookout Creek
Malheur River 
Willow Creek
Mud Creek
Little Willow Creek
Turner Creek
Lick Creek
Gum Creek
Phipps Creek
West Fork Phipps Creek
Black Creek
Bully Creek
North Fork Malheur River
Little Malheur River
South Fork Malheur River
Granite Creek
Hot Springs Creek
McEwen Creek
Buck Creek
Visher Creek
Cobb Creek
Coyote Creek
Coleman Creek
Swamp Creek
Crane Creek
Pole Creek
Deadman Creek
Indian Creek
Camp Creek
Owyhee River 
Crooked Rattlesnake Creek
Jordan Creek
Boney Canyon
Dry Creek
Rock Creek
Cow Creek
Jack Creek
Downey Creek
Hooker Creek
Sheep Spring Creek
Baxter Creek
Trout Creek
North Fork Owyhee River
Middle Fork Owyhee River
Pole Creek
Field Creek
Berry Gulch
Summit Springs Creek
Cherry Creek
Squaw Creek 
Juniper Creek 
Pleasant Valley Creek 
Noon Creek 
West Little Owyhee River
Cave Creek
Toppin Creek
Little Spring Creek
Jack Creek
Lake Fork West Owyhee River
Succor Creek (originates and drains into Snake River outside Oregon)
Necanicum River
Neawanna Creek
Neacoxie Creek
East Fork Neacoxie Creek
Thompson Creek
Mill Creek
Shangri-La Creek
Little Muddy Creek
Circle Creek
Beerman Creek
Williamson Creek
Meyer Creek
Volmer Creek
Klootchy Creek
Johnson Creek
Mail Creek
South Fork Necanicum River
Brandis Creek
Lindsley Creek
Alder Creek
North Fork Necanicum River
Wolf Creek
Little Humbug Creek
Warner Creek
Charlie Creek
Bergsvik Creek
Joe Creek
Little Joe Creek
Grindy Creek
Indian Creek
Canyon Creek
Ecola Creek
Logan Creek
North Fork Ecola Creek
West Fork Ecola Creek
Chisana Creek
Clayton Creek
Red Rock Creek
Griffin Creek
Fall Creek
Austin Creek
Asbury Creek
Shark Creek
Arch Cape Creek
Short Sand Creek
Necarney Creek
Nehalem River
Jetty Creek
Messhouse Creek
Cheviot Creek
Japanese Creek
Alder Creek
Neahkahnie Creek
Vosburg Creek
Fisher Creek
Zimmerman Creek
Bobs Creek
North Fork Nehalem River
Anderson Creek
Coal Creek
West Fork Coal Creek
Gravel Creek
Rackheap Creek
Big Rackheap Creek
Little Rackheap Creek
Fall Creek
Acey Creek
Henderson Creek
Boykin Creek
Grassy Lake Creek
Cougar Creek
Trail Creek
Buchanan Creek
Soapstone Creek
Jack Horner Creek
Gods Valley Creek
Gray Creek
Crawford Creek
Hanson Creek
Hobsen Creek
Roberson Creek
Picket Creek
Lost Creek
Sweet Home Creek
Fall Creek
Little North Fork Nehalem River
Kebbe Creek
Foley Creek
Crystal Creek
East Foley Creek
Dry Creek
Roy Creek
Peterson Creek
School Creek
Anderson Creek
Batterson Creek
Skink Creek
Cook Creek
Dry Creek
Clammer Creek
Harliss Creek
Hanson Creek
McKenny Creek
South Fork Cook Creek
Starr Creek
Strahm Creek
East Fork Cook Creek
Granite Creek
Hoevet Creek
Forks Creek
McPherson Creek
Lost Creek
Sibley Creek
Fall Creek
West Fall Creek
Bidwell Creek
Helloff Creek
Pickens Creek
Rector Creek
Wooley Creek
Bastard Creek
Snark Creek
Salmonberry River
Hatchery Creek
Brix Creek
Belfort Creek
Preston Creek
Tank Creek
Tunnel Creek
Clay Creek
South Fork Salmonberry River
Bathtub Creek
North Fork Salmonberry River
Belding Creek
Sappington Creek
Kinney Creek
Wolf Creek
Little Baldwin Creek
Baldwin Creek
Pennoyer Creek
Cronin Creek
North Fork Cronin Creek
Middle Fork Cronin Creek
South Fork Cronin Creek
Spruce Run Creek
South Fork Spruce Run Creek
Lost Lake Creek
George Creek
Humbug Creek
McClure Creek
Larsen Creek
Big Creek
Alder Creek
Cedar Creek
East Humbug Creek
West Humbug Creek
Beaver Creek
Destruction Creek
Quartz Creek
North Fork Quartz Creek
South Fork Quartz Creek
Osweg Creek
George Creek
Cow Creek
Klines Creek
Moores Creek
Furtado Creek
Buster Creek
Walker Creek
Stanley Creek
Beneke Creek
Fishhawk Creek
Little Fishhawk Creek
Hamilton Creek
Gilmore Creek
Walker Creek
Trailover Creek
Bull Heifer Creek
Slaughters Creek
Crawford Creek
Strum Creek
Squaw Creek
West Branch Squaw Creek
Northrup Creek
Cow Creek
Sager Creek
Lousignont Creek
Nelson Creek
Grub Creek
Deep Creek
Cougar Creek
Lane Creek
Fishhawk Creek
Warner Creek
Boxler Creek
McCoon Creek
North Fork Fishhawk Creek
Wrong Way Creek
Beaver Creek
Adams Creek
Calvin Creek
Lindgren Creek
Lyons Creek
Battle Creek
Johnson Creek
Mud Fork
South Fork Battle Creek
Deer Creek
Little Deer Creek
Gus Creek
Cedar Creek
Oak Ranch Creek
Archibald Creek
Fall Creek
Crooked Creek
Cook Creek
East Fork Nehalem River
Dog Creek
Elk Creek
Kenusky Creek
Jim George Creek
Knickerson Creek
Coon Creek
Pebble Creek
Swamp Creek
Coal Creek
Dell Creek
West Fork Pebble Creek
Rock Creek
Bear Creek
Ivy Creek
Maynard Creek
Selder Creek
Fall Creek
Ginger Creek
Martin Creek
Weed Creek
Olson Creek
North Fork Rock Creek
Military Creek
South Fork Rock Creek
Bear Creek
Beaver Creek
Cedar Creek
Weed Creek
Clear Creek
South Prong Clear Creek
Green Timber Creek
North Fork Green Timber Creek
South Fork Green Timber Creek
Lower North Fork
Upper North Fork
South Fork Clear Creek
Kist Creek
Robinsom Creek
Wolf Creek
North Fork Wolf Creek
Lousignont Creek
North Fork Lousignont Creek
Carlson Creek
Castor Creek
Step Creek
Derby Creek
Reliance Creek
South Fork Nehalem River
Crescent Creek
Steinhilber Creek
Spring Creek
Saltair Creek
Heitmiller Creek
Brimmer Creek
Rock Creek
Watseco Creek
Miami River
Electric Creek 
Hobson Creek
Struby Creek
Illingsworth Creek
Moss Creek
Minich Creek
Peterson Creek
Prouty Creek
Kilchis River
Murphy Creek
Myrtle Creek
Clear Creek
Little South Fork Kilchis River
Washout Creek
School Creek
Sharp Creek
North Fork Kilchis River
South Fork Kilchis River
Wilson River
Hall Slough
Slide Creek
Beaver Creek
Hughey Creek
Donaldson Creek
Tillison Creek
Little North Fork Wilson River
White Creek
George Creek
Shadow Creek
Blowout Creek
Berry Creek
Klahn Creek
Trask River
Nolan Slough
Hoquarten Slough
Mill Creek
Green Creek
Hanenkrat Creek
Gold Creek
Cedar Creek
Panther Creek
Little Rock Creek
Trowbridge Creek
Hatchery Creek
Blue Ridge Creek
Burton Creek
Bill Creek
Samson Creek
Rowe Creek
North Fork Trask River
South Fork Trask River
Tillamook River
Dick Creek
Memaloose Creek
Tomlinson Creek
Esther Creek
Fagan Creek
Anderson Creek
Beaver Creek
Bear Creek
Sutton Creek
Beasley Creek
Killam Creek
Fawcett Creek
Simmons Creek
Joe Creek
Munson Creek
Mills Creek
Larson Creek
Short Creek
Baughman Creek
Fall Creek
North Branch Fall Creek
Hodgdon Creek
O'Hara Creek
Rice Creek
Yager Creek
Whiskey Creek
Austin Creek
Hathaway Creek
Jackson Creek
Jackson Creek
Cape Creek
Rover Creek
Big Medwine Creek
Allen Creek
Sand Creek
Reneke Creek
Beltz Creek
Gurtis Creek
Jewel Creek
Davis Creek
Andy Creek
Miles Creek
Nestucca River
Three Rivers
Little Nestucca River
Commons Creek
Neskowin Creek
Kiwanda Creek
Hawk Creek
Butte Creek
Fall Creek
Prospect Creek
Jim Creek
Lewis Creek
Sloan Creek
Kingston Creek
Sutton Creek
Chitwood Creek
Cliff Creek
Salmon River
Teal Creek
Crowley Creek
Rowdy Creek
Frazer Creek
Salmon Creek
Deer Creek
Willis Creek
Panther Creek
Bear Creek
Morton Creek
Southman Creek
Tarry Creek
McMullen Creek
Slick Rock Creek
Widow Creek
Alder Brook
Treat River
Deer Creek 
Sulphur Creek
Prairie Creek
Indian Creek
Boulder Creek
Little Salmon River
Logan Creek
D River
Rock Creek
Thompson Creek
Devil River
Agnes Creek
Baldy Creek
Schooner Creek 
Fall Creek
North Fork Schooner Creek
South Fork Schooner Creek
Drift Creek 
Anderson Creek
Gordey Creek
Bluff Creek
Odell Creek
Quarry Creek
North Creek
Wildcat Creek
Sampson Creek
Smith Creek
Barn Creek
Fowler Creek
Nelson Creek
Millport Slough 
George Creek
Tony Creek
Bones Creek
Siletz River
Anderson Creek
Barhaven Creek
Skunk Creek
Bear Creek
Reed Creek
Foster Creek
Butterfield Creek
Scare Creek
Stemple Creek
Townsend Creek
Skalada Creek
Roots Creek
Roy Creek
Misac Creek
Jaybird Creek
Cedar Creek
Wade Creek
Hough Creek
Reed Creek
Euchre Creek
Ojalla Creek
Thompson Creek
Spencer Creek
Tangerman Creek
Dewey Creek
Mill Creek
Baker Creek
Bentilla Creek
Scott Creek
Sam Creek
Rock Creek
Mill Creek
Baker Creek
Palmer Creek
Wildcat Creek
Wolfer Creek
Buck Creek
Sunshine Creek
Holman Creek
Elk Creek
Blind Creek
Gravel Creek
North Fork Siletz River
South Fork Siletz River
Schoolhouse Creek
Fogarty Creek
Salmon Creek
Depoe Bay Creek
North Depoe Bay Creek
South Depoe Bay Creek
Deadhorse Creek
Rocky Creek
Dope Creek
Miner Creek
Johnson Creek
Spencer Creek
North Fork Spencer Creek
South Fork Spencer Creek
Wade Creek
Coal Creek
Moolack Creek
Schooner Creek
Little Creek
Lucky Gap Creek
Big Creek
Jeffries Creek
Anderson Creek
Blattner Creek
Yaquina River
Sallys Slough
King Slough
Parker Slough
McCaffery Slough
Poole Slough
Johnson Slough
Flesher Slough
Blind Slough
Boone Slough
Nute Slough
Montgomery Creek
Babcock Creek
Depot Slough
Olalla Slough
Mill Creek
Abbey Creek
Blair Creek
Big Elk Creek
Carlisle Creek
Little Carlisle Creek
Bear Creek
Martin Creek
Sloop Creek
Simpson Creek
Trapp Creek
Thornton Creek
Cougar Creek
Crystal Creek
Whitney Creek
Hayes Creek
Peterson Creek
Eddy Creek
Little Elk Creek
Trout Creek
Bales Creek
Buttermilk Creek
Bryant Creek
Stony Creek
Randall Creek
Davis Creek
Felton Creek
Young Creek
Humphrey Creek
Splide Creek
Little Yaquina River
Cedar Creek
Bailey Creek
Henderson Creek
Grant Creek
Moore Creek
Thiel Creek
Lost Creek
Beaver Creek
Tracy Creek
Pumphouse Creek
South Beaver Creek
Oliver Creek
Graves Creek
Simpson Creek
Bunnel Creek
Worth Creek
Elkhorn Creek
North Fork Elkhorn Creek
North Fork Beaver Creek
Bowers Creek
Peterson Creek
Lewis Creek
Deer Creek
Hill Creek
Little Creek
Squaw Creek
Collins Creek
South Fork Collins Creek
Fox Creek
Buckley Creek
Friday Creek
Thursday Creek
Alsea River
Lint Creek
Red River
Eckman Creek
Drift Creek
Constantine Creek
Southworth Creek
Arnold Creek
Risley Creek
Canal Creek
Squaw Creek
Mill Creek
Line Creek
Hatchery Creek
Slide Creek
Scott Creek
Schoolhouse Creek
Brush Creek
Grass Creek
Lake Creek
Five Rivers
Bear Creek
Elk Creek
Lobster Creek
Taylor Creek
McGlynn Creek
Crooked Creek
Phillips Creek
Camp Creek
Wilkinson Creek
Little Lobster Creek
Briar Creek
Preacher Creek
Martha Creek
Meadow Creek
Coal Bank Creek
Cook Creek
Bear Creek
East Fork Lobster Creek
South Fork Lobster Creek
Swamp Creek
Cascade Creek
Cherry Creek
Buck Creek
Cougar Creek
Crab Creek
Alder Creek
Crazy Creek
Green River
Ryan Creek
East Fork Green River
Fendall Creek
Cedar Creek
Summers Creek
Lord Creek
Prindel Creek
Butter Creek
Cedar Creek
Wolf Creek
Minotti Creek
Cow Creek
Fall Creek
Digger Creek
Benner Creek
Salmonberry Creek
Maltby Creek
Narrows Creek
Birch Creek
Schoolhouse Creek
Mill Creek
Roberts Creek
Cathcart Creek
North Fork Alsea River
Kiger Creek
Honey Grove Creek
Ryder Creek
Hayden Creek
Seeley Creek
Crooked Creek
Bailey Creek
Gravel Creek
Easter Creek
Slide Creek
Sweethome Creek
Klickitat Creek
Lake Creek
South Fork Alsea River
Bummer Creek
Headrick Creek
Cedar Creek
Table Creek
Dubuque Creek
Rock Creek
Blackberry Creek
Peak Creek
Fall Creek
Coleman Creek
Williams Creek
Patterson Creek
Little Creek
Reynolds Creek
Big Creek
Dicks Fork
South Fork Big Creek
Vingie Creek
Starr Creek
Mitchell Creek
Yachats River
Salmon Creek
Reedy Creek
Marks Creek
South Beamer Creek
Beamer Creek
Dawson Creek
Carson Creek
Clear Creek
Bend Creek
Werner Creek
Helms Creek
Axtell Creek
North Fork Yachats River
Neiglick Creek
Stump Creek
Keller Creek
School Fork
Grass Creek
North Cape Creek
Cape Creek
Gwynn Creek
Cummins Creek
Little Cummins Creek
Nancy Creek
Bob Creek
Agate Creek
Tenmile Creek
Mill Creek
McKinney Creek
South Fork
Wildcat Creek
Tokatee Creek
Nancy Creek
Rock Creek
Big Creek
Fryingpan Creek
Panther Creek
China Creek
Blowout Creek
Cape Creek
Wapiti Creek
North Fork Cape Creek
Horse Creek
Berry Creek
Quarry Creek
Sutton Creek
Mercer Creek
Levage Creek
Dahlin Creek
Bailey Creek
Mitchell Creek
Rath Creek
Siuslaw River
South Slough
Demming Creek
North Fork Siuslaw River
Lindsley Creek
Slover Creek
Haring Creek
Morris Creek
Bellstrom Canyon
Culver Creek
Condon Creek
Jim Dick Creek
South Russell Creek
Russell Creek
Shumard Creek
Stout Creek
Stout Canyon
South Johns Creek
McLeod Creek
Cataract Creek
Drew Creek
Wilhelm Creek
Porter Creek
Deadman Creek
Taylor Creek
Cedar Creek
West Branch Sam Creek
Sam Creek
Skunk Hollow
Saubert Creek
Cox Creek
Prosser Slough
Schulte Creek
Duncan Inlet
Bernhardt Creek
Karnowski Creek
Peterson Creek
Wendson Canyon
Olsen Creek
Schoolhouse Creek
Hanson Creek
Hoffman Creek
David Creek
Mason Creek
Sweet Creek
Ellingson Creek
Cedar Creek
Elk Wallow Creek
Fall Creek
Beaver Creek
Deer Creek
South Canyon
Sheep Ranch Creek
Hand Creek
Lloyd Creek
South Fork Sweet Creek
Neilson Creek
Saunders Creek
Martin Creek
Hadsell Creek
Rice Creek
Rice Creek 
Knowles Creek
Jackson Creek
Bridge Creek
Dinner Creek
Hood Creek
Sulphur Creek
Hollenbeck Creek
Lacey Creek
Snell Creek
Slide Gulch
Berkshire Creek
Walker Creek
Shoemaker Creek
Spencer Creek
Barber Creek
Wilson Creek
Thompson Creek
La Bar Creek
Cleveland Creek
Rock Canyon
Old Man Creek
Lake Creek
Indian Creek
Velvet Creek
Elk Creek
Cremo Creek
West Fork Indian Creek
Snoot Creek
Gibson Creek
Taylor Creek
Herman Creek
North Fork Indian Creek
Deadwood Creek
Green Creek
Boyle Creek
West Fork Deadwood Creek
Swartz Creek
Raleigh Creek
Bear Creek
South Fork Bear Creek
Deer Creek
Alpha Creek
Karlstrom Creek
Rock Creek
Buck Creek
Panther Creek
Elk Creek
Fawn Creek
Johnston Creek
Hollo Creek
Almasie Creek
Wilcut Creek
Nelson Creek
Wheeler Creek
Steinhauer Creek
Greenleaf Creek
Lamb Creek
Fish Creek
Spring Canyon Creek
Little Lake Creek
Pontiss Creek
Swamp Creek
Post Creek
Pope Creek
Conrad Creek
Village Creek
Swartz Creek
Congdon Creek
Billy Turner Canyon
Brush Creek
East Fork Brush Creek
Tilden Creek
Barber Creek
Pat Creek
Little Beecher Creek
Beecher Creek
San Antone Creek
Sharon Creek
Dry Creek
Smith Creek
Meadow Creek
Rock Creek
Preston Creek
School House Creek
Turner Creek
Waite Creek
Sutherland Creek
Wildcat Creek
Fowler Creek
Pataha Creek
Schultz Creek
Kirk Creek
Walker Creek
Chickahominy Creek
Fish Creek
Bulmer Creek
Salt Creek
Warden Creek
Whittaker Creek
Wolf Creek
Leopold Creek
Cedar Creek
Fawn Creek
Pugh Creek
Trail Creek
North Creek
Mill Creek
Collins Creek
Haskins Creek
Larue Creek
Clay Creek
Edris Creek
Burntwood Creek
Bierce Creek
Johnson Creek
Layne Creek
Oxbow Creek
Bear Creek
Haight Creek
Shitten Creek
Camp Creek
Conger Creek
Pheasant Creek
Dogwood Creek
Holland Creek
Jeans Creek
Doe Hollow Creek
Fryingpan Creek
Bottle Creek
Buck Creek
Doe Creek
Russell Creek
Simpson Creek
Shaw Creek
Smith Creek
Little Sisuslaw Creek
Fawn Creek
Letz Creek
Douglas Creek
North Fork Siuslaw River
Farman Creek
Crow Creek
Norris Creek
Hawley Creek
South Fork Siuslaw River
Gardner Creek
Lucas Creek
Sandy Creek
Kelley Creek
Tucker Creek
Maxwell Creek
Siltcoos River
Woahink Creek
Miller Creek
Lane Creek
Silver Creek
Fiddle Creek
Young Creek
King Creek
Alder Creek
Bear Creek
Deer Creek
Morris Creek
Maple Creek
Mills Creek
Johns Creek
Schrum Creek
Carle Creek
Roache Creek
Grant Creek
Carter Creek
Jordan Creek
Starks Creek
Stokes Creek
Ryder Creek
Buckwheat Creek
Henderson Creek
Coleman Creek
Shultz Creek
Tahkenitch Creek
Elbow Lake Creek
Leitel Creek
Mallard Creek
John Sims Creek
Fivemile Creek
Perkins Creek
Patterson Creek
Harry Creek
Bell Creek
Threemile Creek
Umpqua River
Winchester Creek
Providence Creek
Scholfield Creek
Smith River
Butler Creek
Frantz Creek
Hudson Slough
Camp Seven Gulch
Otter Slough
Brainard Creek
Black Creek
Joyce Creek
Cassidy Creek
Noel Creek
Eslick Creek 
Russian John Gulch
North Fork Smith River
Railroad Creek
Straddle Creek
Dry Creek
Johnson Creek
Edmonds Creek
McKinney Creek
Georgia Creek
Chapman Creek
Sulphur Creek
Harlan Creek
Paxton Creek
West Branch North Fork Smith River
Middle Fork North Fork Smith River
Kentucky Creek
Sheep Herder Creek
Jump Creek
Murphy Creek
Wasson Creek
Taylor Creek
Spencer Creek
Dailey Creek
Doe Creek
Fawn Creek
Buck Creek
Little Buck Creek
Bear Creek
Johnson Creek
Rachel Creek
Vincent Creek
West Fork Smith River
Coon Creek
Crane Creek
Moore Creek
Beaver Creek
Gold Creek
Scare Creek
Blackwell Creek
Clearwater Creek
Carpenter Creek
Beaver Creek
North Sister Creek
South Sister Creek
Devils Club Creek
Marsh Creek
Rock Creek
Blind Creek
Mosetown Creek
Halfway Creek
Clabber Creek
Slideout Creek
Johnson Creek
Cleghorn Creek
Hardenbrook Creek
Yellow Creek
Deer Creek
Huckleberry Creek
Haney Creek
Panther Creek
Amberson Creek
Salmonberry Creek
South Fork Smith River
Arthur Jones Creek
Elk Creek
Beaver Creek
Clevenger Creek
Plank Creek
Hefty Creek
Summit Creek
Hall Creek
Redford Creek
Peterson Creek
Tip Davis Creek
Sleezer Creek
Watering Trough Creek
Alder Creek
Whiskey Creek
Spring Creek
Dean Creek
Harvey Creek
Indian Charlie Creek
Franklin Creek
Charlotte Creek
Luder Creek
Mill Creek
Little Mill Creek
Wells Creek
Golden Creek
Burchard Creek
Weatherly Creek
Lutsinger Creek
Butler Creek
Scott Creek
Little Stony Brook Creek
Stony Brook Creek
Paradise Creek
Sawyer Creek
Gould Creek
Beener Creek
Hart Creek
Grubbe Creek
Elk Creek
Little Tom Folley Creek
Hancock Creek
Big Tom Folley Creek
Saddle Butte Creek
North Fork Tom Folley Creek
Brush Creek
Indian Creek
Lancaster Creek
Parker Creek
Jack Creek
Johney Creek
Hardscrabble Creek
Billy Creek
Bear Creek
East Fork Billy Creek
Andrews Creek
South Fork Billy Creek
Flagler Creek
Post Creek
Pass Creek
Hedrick Creek
Krewson Creek
Johnson Creek
Fitch Creek
Ellenburg Creek
Little Sand Creek
Sand Creek
Rock Creek
Buck Creek
Pheasant Creek
Bear Creek
Ward Creek
Yoncalla Creek
Hanlon Creek
Halo Creek
Cowan Creek
Huntington Creek
Wilson Creek
Wise Creek
McClintock Creek
Asker Creek
Dodge Canyon
Wehmeyer Creek
Salt Creek
Cox Creek
Thief Creek
Curtis Creek
South Fork Curtis Creek
North Fork Curtis Creek
Lees Creek
Bennet Creek
Adams Creek
Walker Creek
Shingle Mill Creek
Heddin Creek
Fitzpatrick Creek
Mehl Creek
Whitehorse Creek
Williams Creek
Brads Creek
Martin Creek
Waggoner Creek
McGee Creek
Deep Gulch
Yellow Creek
Galagher Canyon
Lost Creek
Basin Creek
Leonard Creek
Powell Creek
Wolf Creek
Cougar Creek
Bottle Creek
Rock Creek
Hubbard Creek
Mill Creek
Calapooya Creek
Burke Creek
Coon Creek
Dodge Canyon Creek
Cook Creek
Cabin Creek
Pollock Creek
Oldham Creek
Foster Creek
Banks Creek
Long Valley Creek
Pelland Creek
Cantell Creek
Gassy Creek
Gilbreath Creek
Hinkle Creek
Jeffers Creek
Filler Creek
Cooper Creek
Buzzard Roost Creek
Timothy Creek
Coon Creek
White Creek
North Fork Calapooya Creek
South Fork Calapooya Creek
Hidden Valley Creek
North Umpqua River
Sutherlin Creek
Dixon Creek
Clover Creek
Oak Creek
Cooper Creek
Huntley Creek
Fordice Creek
Little River
Buckthorn Creek
Fall Creek
Williams Creek
Rattlesnake Creek
Eagles Creek
Jim Creek
Cavitt Creek
Evans Creek
McKay Creek
Buckshot Creek
Buck Peak Creek
Boulder Creek
Copperhead Creek
White Rock Creek
Mill Creek
Springer Creek
Tuttle Creek
Liveoak Creek
Cultus Creek
Plusfour Creek
Withrow Creek
Bond Creek
Boundary Creek
Greenman Creek
Wolf Creek
Egglestron Creek
West Fork Wolf Creek
Little Creek
Shivigny Creek
Emile Creek
Negro Creek
White Creek
Poore Creek
Little Taft Creek
Black Creek
Dutch Creek
Clover Creek
Flat Rock Branch
Taft Creek
Cedar Creek
Pinnacle Creek
Junction Creek
Hemlock Creek
French Creek
Old Hatchery Creek
Britt Creek
Rock Creek
Hill Creek
Clay Creek
Honey Creek
Bob Creek
Hogback Creek
Susan Creek
Cole Creek
Fox Creek
Swamp Creek
Burnt Creek
Thunder Creek
Fall Creek
Fairview Creek
Raspberry Creek
Wright Creek
John Creek
Bogus Creek
Cougar Creek
Archie Creek
Timber Creek
Williams Creek
Fisher Creek
Alder Creek
Steamboat Creek
Redman Creek
Jack Creek
Apple Creek
Limpy Creek
Dog Creek
Calf Creek
Happy Creek
Dry Creek
Dry Gulch
Deception Creek
Wilson Creek
Dark Canyon
Copeland Creek
Eagle Creek
Boulder Creek
Medicine Creek
Fish Creek
Clearwater River
Deer Creek
Loafer Creek
Charlia Creek
Alvin Creek
Patricia Creek
Barkenburger Creek
Nurse Creek
Potter Creek
Sally Creek
Dorothy Creek
Norma Creek
Helen Creek
Beverly Creek
Nancy Creek
Warm Spring Creek
White Mule Creek
Poole Creek
Lake Creek
Thielsen Creek
Sheep Creek
Two Bear Creek
Spruce Creek
Rabbit Creek
Porcupine Creek
Camp Creek
Short Creek
Silent Creek
Spring River
Thirsty Creek
Bradley Creek
Tolo Creek
South Umpqua River
Champagne Creek
Elgarose Creek
Callahan Creek
Doerner Creek
Dysert Creek
Willow Creek
Stockel Creek
Newton Creek
Deer Creek
DaMotta Branch
Shick Creek
North Fork Deer Creek
Livingston Creek
Rose Creek
South Fork Deer Creek
Tucker Creek
Melton Creek
Middle Fork of South Fork Deer Creek
Parrott Creek
Roberts Creek
North Fork Roberts Creek
Marsters Creek
Lookingglass Creek
Applegate Creek
Morgan Creek
Flourny Creek
Rock Creek
Larson Creek
Olalla Creek
Perron Creek
McNabb Creek
Weaver Creek
Berry Creek
Coarse Gold Creek
Bear Creek
Byron Creek
East Fork Byron Creek
North Fork Byron Creek
Bushnell Creek
Thompson Creek
Wildcat Creek
Willingham Creek
Tenmile Creek
Porter Creek
Irwin Creek
Shields Creek
Suicide Creek
Little Muley Creek
Muns Creek
Bear Creek
Wilson Creek
Brockway Creek
Kent Creek
Squaw Creek
Adams Creek
Alberson Creek
Rice Creek
Porter Creek
Barrett Creek
Willis Creek
East Willis Creek
West Willis Creek
Clark Branch
Richardson Creek
Van Dine Creek
Myrtle Creek
North Myrtle Creek
Bilger Creek
Little Lick Creek
Big Lick Creek
Frozen Creek
West Fork Frozen Creek
Slide Creek
Lee Creek
Buck Fork Creek
South Myrtle Creek
Cedar Hollow
School Hollow
Ben Branch
Louis Creek
Short Wiley Creek
Long Wiley Creek
Letitia Creek
Weaver Creek
Lally Creek
Johnson Creek
Curtin Creek
Cow Creek
Shoestring Creek
Mitchell Creek
Veatch Creek
Copper Creek
Jerry Creek
Russell Creek
Catching Creek
Council Creek
Crawford Branch
Squaw Creek
Beatty Creek
Rattlesnake Creek
Alder Creek
Island Creek
Salt Creek
Doe Creek
Cookhouse Creek
Little Doe Creek
Buck Creek
Minnie Creek
Polan Creek
Smith Creek
Iron Mountain Creek
Table Creek
Little Dads Creek
Cattle Creek
Calf Creek
Corral Creek
Union Creek
Staircase Creek
Dribble Creek
Live Oak Creek
Manzanita Creek
Short Creek
Stanchion Creek
Darby Creek
North Fork Darby Creek
West Fork Darby Creek
Dutchman Creek
West Fork Cow Creek
Jacob Creek
Bear Creek
Goat Trail Creek
Honeysuckle Creek
Slotted Pen Creek
Hayes Creek
Soldier Creek
Sweat Creek
No Sweat Creek
Bobby Creek
Elk Valley Creek
Panther Creek
Gold Mountain Creek
Lipp Creek
Johnston Creek
Smith Creek
Kleiner Creek
Walker Creek
Wallace Creek
Slide Creek
Stanley Creek
Black Creek
Grant Creek
Bear Creek
Wilson Creek
Bolivar Creek
Fuller Creek
Tenmile Creek
Saunders Creek
Eel Creek
Clear Creek
Big Creek
Blacks Creek
Parker Creek
Murphy Creek
Wilkins Creek
Noble Creek
Adams Creek
Shutter Creek
Johnson Creek
Robertson Creek
Roberts Creek
Hatchery Creek
Copple Creek
Benson Creek
Coos River
Catching Slough
Lillian Creek
Vogel Creek
Noah Creek
Millicoma River
Matt Davis Creek
Hendrickson Creek
Deton Creek
Woodruff Creek
East Fork Millicoma River
Nowlit Creek
Marlow Creek
Hodges Creek
Rodine Creek
Glenn Creek
Fox Creek
Little Matson Creek
Beulah Creek
West Fork Millicoma River
Rainy Creek
Daggett Creek
Totten Creek
Schumacher Creek
Trout Creek
Buck Creek
Joes Creek
Otter Creek
Deer Creek
Knife Creek
Elk Creek
Fish Creek
Panther Creek
Kelly Creek
Cougar Creek
South Fork Coos River
Morgan Creek
Rogers Creek
Bessey Creek
McKnight Creek
Salmon Creek
West Creek
East Creek
Big Creek
Cox Creek
Burma Creek
Rock Crusher Creek
Elk Creek
Fannin Creek
Coal Creek
Fall Creek
Mink Creek
Tioga Creek
Williams River
Bottom Creek
Skip Creek
Cedar Creek
Cabin Creek
Fall Creek
Gooseberry Gulch
Bear Gulch
Panther Creek
Fivemile Creek
Wilson Creek
Little Cow Creek
Lost Creek
Miner Creek
Big Creek
First Creek
Cave Creek
Mussel Creek
Fivemile Creek
Threemile Creek
Twomile Creek
Whisky Run
Cut Creek
South Branch Cut Creek
Polly Creek
Coquille River
Ferry Creek
Simpson Creek
Spring Creek
Peterson Gulch
Fahys Creek
Sevenmile Creek
Offield Creek via Randolph Slough
Bear Creek
Lowe Creek
Lampa Creek
Alder Creek
Hatchet Slough
Iowa Slough
Beaver Slough
China Creek
Calloway Creek
Fat Elk Creek
Rink Creek
Pulaski Creek
Glen Aiken Creek
Fishtrap Creek
Gray Creek
Hall Creek
Grady Creek
North Fork Coquille River
Llewellyn Creek
Carey Creek
Kessler Creek
Johns Creek
East Fork Coquille River
Weekly Creek
Elk Creek
Yankee Run
Hantz Creek
Steel Creek
Bills Creek
China Creek
Brummit Creek
Camas Creek
Dead Horse Creek
Lost Creek
Knapper Creek
Wimer Creek
Wood Creek
Garage Creek
Schoolhouse Creek
Lost Creek
Blair Creek
Steele Creek
Evans Creek
Swayne Creek
Hudson Creek
Moon Creek
Whilley Creek
Neeley Creek
Giles Creek
North Fork Creek
Little North Fork Coquille River
South Fork Coquille River
Middle Fork Coquille River
Mill Creek
Indian Creek
Endicott Creek
McMullen Creek
King Creek
Big Creek
Salmon Creek
Myrtle Creek
Belieu Creek
Tanner Creek
Frenchie Creek
Sandy Creek
Fetter Creek
Slide Creek
Upper Rock Creek
Lake Creek
Panther Creek
Slater Creek
Bear Creek
Twelvemile Creek
Mystic  Creek
Bingham Creek
Mill Creek
Day Creek
Jim Belieu Creek 
Reed Creek
Bar Creek
Wildcat Creek
Lang Creek
Cole Creek
Lake Creek 
Estes Creek
Tupper Creek
Johnson Creek
Rosa Creek
Crooked Creek
China Creek
Twomile Creek
South Twomile Creek
Lower Twomile Creek
Redibaugh Creek
New River
Fourmile Creek
Spring Creek
Jenny Creek
South Fork Fourmile Creek
Long Creek
Little Creek
North Fourmile Creek
Davis Creek
Conner Creek
Butte Creek
Bethel Creek
Mill Creek
Morton Creek
Langlois Creek
Floras Creek
Willow Creek
Jim Creek
Joe Cox Creek
Jenny Creek
Johnson Creek
Clear Creek
West Fork Floras Creek
North Fork Floras Creek
Horner Creek
Guerin Creek
East Fork Floras Creek
Huff Creek
Crutchfield Creek
White Rock Creek
Williams Creek
South Fork Floras Creek
Dwyer Creek
Boulder Creek
Sixes River
Sullivan Gulch
Crystal Creek
Beaver Creek
Jenny Creek
Koch Creek
Edson Creek
Dry Creek
Duvall Creek
Grassy Creek
North Fork Dry Creek
Pipeline Creek
Little Dry Creek
Elephant Rock Creek
South Fork Sixes River
Otter Creek
Big Creek
Middle Fork Sixes River
Sucker Creek
Sugar Creek
North Fork Sixes River
Haines Creek
Murphy Canyon
Elk River
Indian Creek
Bagley Creek
Small Creek
Rock Creek
Champman Creek
Coon Creek
Anvil Creek
Bear Creek
Bald Mountain Creek
South Fork Bald Mountain Creek
Platinum Creek
State Creek
Red Cedar Creek
Stan Creek
Sunshine Creek
Panther Creek
West Fork Panther Creek
East Fork Panther Creek
Mid Fork Panther Creek
Lost Creek
Butler Creek
Milbury Creek
Bungalow Creek
Blackberry Creek
McCurdy Creek
North Fork Elk River
Slide Creek
South Fork Elk River
Gold Run Creek
Hubbard Creek
North Fork Hubbard Creek
Rocky Creek
Rocky Point Creek
Retz Creek
Brush Creek
Dry Run Creek
Bear Creek
Beartrap Creek
Reinhart Creek
Mussel Creek
Myrtle Creek
O'Brien Creek
Euchre Creek
Cedar Creek
Rock Creek
Miller Creek
Boulder Creek
Crew Canyon Creek
Crooked Bridge Creek
Greggs Creek
Parker Creek
Rogue River
Dean Creek
Indian Creek
Edson Creek
Squaw Creek
Jim Hunt Creek
Libby Creek
Kimball Creek
Abe Creek
Lobster Creek
Deadline Creek
Fall Creek
Lost Valley Creek
North Fork Lobster Creek
South Fork Lobster Creek
Iron Creek
Boulder Creek
William Miller Creek
Quosantana Creek
Silver Creek
Little Silver Creek
Bill Moore Creek
Slide Creek
Dog Creek
Wakeup Rilea Creek
Auberry Creek
Tom East Creek
Schoolhouse Creek
Nail Keg Creek
Bridge Creek
Sundown Creek
Stonehouse Creek
Painted Rock Creek
Morris Rodgers Creek
Blue Jay Creek
Rilea Creek
 Tom Fry Creek
Illinois River
Snout Creek
Shasta Costa Creek
Waters Creek
Slide Creek
Walker Creek
Twomile Creek
Lone Tree Creek
Billy Creek
Billings Creek
Watson Creek
Dans Creek
Slide Creek
Hicks Creek
Flora Dell Creek
Fall Creek
Clay Hill Creek
Tate Creek
Brushy Bar Creek
East Creek
Jackson Creek
Paradise Creek
Blossom Bar Creek
Burns Creek
Stair Creek
Mule Creek
Long Gulch
Quail Creek
Missouri Creek
Hewitt Creek
Slide Creek
Ditch Creek
Corral Creek
Dulog Creek
Meadow Creek
Cowley Creek
Copsey Creek
Francis Creek
Shady Creek
Jenny Creek
Little Windy Creek
Big Windy Creek
Bunker Creek
Bronco Creek
Howard Creek
Montgomery Creek
Russian Creek
Wildcat Creek
Alder Creek
Whisky Creek
Rum Creek
China Gulch
Singletree Gulch
Ajax Gulch
Grave Creek
Reuben Creek
Rock Creek
McNair Creek
McNabe Creek
Poorman Creek
Fall Creek
Reservoir Creek
Panther Creek
Butte Creek
Wolf Creek
Tom East Creek
Brushy Gulch
Brimstone Gulch
Flume Gulch
Dog Creek
Mackin Gulch
Rat Creek
Salmon Creek
Schoolhouse Gulch
Shanks Creek
Benjamin Gulch
Tom East Creek
Quartz Mill Gulch
Eastman Gulch
Clark Creek
Boulder Creek
Baker Creek
Slate Creek
Little Boulder Creek
Big Boulder Creek
Last Chance Creek
Swamp Creek
Panther Creek
Smith Gulch
Mouse Creek
Smith Creek
Argo Creek
Bailey Creek
Yew Wood Creek
Centennial Gulch
Ash Gulch
North Star Gulch
Belknap Gulch
Hooks Gulch
Maple Gulch
Rocky Gulch
Rich Gulch
Galice Creek
Spangler Gulch
Paint Creek
Delta Creek
Taylor Creek
Stratton Creek
Little Zigzag Creek
Zigzag Creek
Serpentine Gulch
Hog Creek
Jumpoff Joe Creek
Pickett Creek
Rickett Creek
Shan Creek
Pass Creek
Applegate River
Slate Creek
Minnie Creek
Round Prairie Creek
South Fork Round Prairie Creek
Elliott Creek
Waters Creek
Salt Creek
Bear Creek
Welter Creek
Butcherknife Creek
Knight Creek
Love Creek
Ramsey Creek
Cedar Log Creek
Buckeye Creek
Cheney Creek
Little Cheney Creek
Bull Creek
Jackson Creek
Stringer Creek
Skunk Creek
Panther Creek
Mathiasen Creek
Iron Creek
Onion Creek
Murphy Creek
Dry Creek
Case Creek
Spencer Creek
Grays Creek
Board Shanty Creek
Wildcat Gulch
Johnston Creek
Oscar Creek
Black Canyon Creek
Dales Bluff Creek
Caris Creek
Miller Creek
Rocky Creek
Miners Creek
Hog Eye Creek
Slagle Creek
Wooldridge Creek
Williams Creek
Pennington Creek
Powell Creek
Camp Meeting Creek
Honeysuckle Creek
Wallow Creek
Water Gap Creek
Cove Creek
Ferris Gulch
Thompson Creek
Little Applegate River
Sterling Creek
Yale Creek
Glade Creek
McDonald Creek
Elliot Creek

 
Vannoy Creek
Sand Creek
Allen Creek
Fruitdale Creek
Jones Creek
Greens Creek
Rich Gulch
Savage Creek
Little Savage Creek
Evans Creek
Fielder Creek
Right Fork Fielder Creek
Left Fork Fielder Creek
Bear Branch
Pleasant Creek
Sykes Creek
May Creek
Faun Creek
West Fork Evans Creek
Spignet Creek
Morrison Creek
Musty Creek
Canon Creek
Chapman Creek
Coal Creek
Wolf Creek
Railroad Gap Creek
Ward Creek
Birdseye Creek
Foots Creek
Sardine Creek
Galls Creek
Water Gulch
Sams Creek
Middough Creek
Bear Creek
Jackson Creek
Dean Creek
Cantrall Creek
Griffin Creek
Murphy Creek
Crooked Creek
Lazy Creek
Larson Creek
Coleman Creek
Payne Creek
Anderson Creek
North Fork Anderson Creek
South Fork Anderson Creek
Kenutchen Creek
Wagner Creek
Holton Creek
Arrastra Creek
Goose Creek
Myer Creek
Butler Creek
Wrights Creek
Ashland Creek
East Fork Ashland Creek
West Fork Ashland Creek
Gaerky Creek
Clay Creek
Emigrant Creek
Walker Creek
Cove Creek
Dosier Creek
North Branch Cove Creek
Big Creek
South Branch Cove Creek
Prairie Branch Cover Creek
Frog Creek
Ice House Creek
Babe Creek
Hill Creek
Barron Creek
Slide Creek
Wall Creek
Viaduct Creek
Sampson Creek
Right Fork Sampson Creek
Carter Creek
Tyler Creek
Schoolhouse Creek
Baldy Creek
Green Mountain Creek
Porcupine Creek
Neil Creek
Tolman Creek
Clayton Creek
Y Creek
Whetstone Creek
Swanson Creek
Snider Creek
Molby Creek
Little Butte Creek
Antelope Creek
Dry Creek
Quarter Branch
Yankee Creek
Spring Creek
Hawkins Creek
Lick Creek
Salt Creek
Joint System Canal
Lake Creek
South Fork Little Butte Creek
Lost Creek
Coon Creek
Dead Indian Creek
Beaver Dam Creek
North Fork Little Butte Creek
Constance Creek
Hog Creek
Reese Creek
North Fork Reese Creek
South Fork Reese Creek
Bull Run Creek
Neil Creek
Dry Creek
Langel Creek
Branch Creek
Long Branch
Indian Creek
Deer Creek
Cricket Creek
Trail Creek
Canyon Creek
West Fork Trail Creek
Kendale Creek
Paradise Creek
Romine Creek
Walpole Creek
Chicago Creek
Buck Rock Creek
Wall Creek
Dead Horse Creek
Clear Creek
Lewis Creek
Brush Creek
Bush Creek
Elk Creek
Berry Creek
West Branch Elk Creek
Spot Creek
Morine Creek
Hungry Creek
Alco Creek
Middle Creek
Flat Creek
Shell Creek
Jones Creek
Sugarpine Creek
Hawk Creek
Elkhorn Creek
Pelt Creek
Timber Creek
Kettle Creek
Coalmine Creek
Dodes Creek
Button Creek
Squaw Creek
Alder Creek
Bitter Lick Creek
Swanson Creek
Brush Creek
Big Butte Creek
Vine Creek
Clark Creek
North Fork Clark Creek
South Fork Clark Creek
McNeil Creek
Neil Creek
Quartz Creek
Cattail Creek
Geppert Creek
Dog Creek
Box Creek
North Fork Big Butte Creek
Eighty Acre Creek
Friese Creek
Jackass Creek
Mule Creek
Horseshoe Creek
Camp Creek
Phillips Creek
Cedar Springs Creek
Hukill Creek
Ginger Creek
Doubleday Creek
Bowen Creek
Richard Creek
Willow Creek
Ash Creek
East Fork Ash Creek
West Fork Ash Creek
Horse Creek
Skeeters Creek
Duel Creek
Bieberstedt Creek
North Fork Bieberstedt Creek
South Fork Bieberstedt Creek
East Branch Willow Creek
West Branch Willow Creek
Walch Creek
Buck Point Creek
Nork Creek
Farva Creek
South Fork Big Butte Creek
Fourbit Creek
North Fork Fourbit Creek
Buck Basin Fork
Gypsy Fork
South Fork Fourbit Creek
Beaver Fork
Clarks Fork Creek
South Fork Clarks Fork Creek
Rancheria Creek
Fireline Creek
Deception Creek
Titanic Creek
Twincheria Creek
Misfit Creek
Lost Creek
Rumley Creek
Blue Gulch
Floras Creek
Diamond Creek
Knighten Creek
Taggarts Creek
Tie Creek
Hole in the Ground Creek
Cold Spring Creek
Middle Creek
Hurd Creek
South Fork Rogue River
Smith Creek
Ash Creek
Beaver Dam Creek
Round Mountain Creek
Crane Creek
Parsnip Creek
Cur Creek
Vine Maple Creek
South Fork Vine Maple Creek
Middle Fork Rogue River
Red Blanket Creek
Lick Creek
Varmint Creek
Daniel Creek
Svinth Creek
Twentynine Creek
Gyppo Creek
Bessie Creek
Fire Creek
Fall Creek
Kerby Creek
Foot Creek
Halifax Creek
Honeymoon Creek
Buck Creek
Geppert Creek
Imnaha Creek
Sumpter Creek
Wallowa Creek
North Fork Wallowa Creek
South Fork Wallowa Creek
Whitman Creek
Spring Creek
Lodgepole Creek
Green Creek
Nichols Creek
Big Ben Creek
Frey Creek
Fantail Creek
Sam Creek
Wickiup Creek
Little Billie Creek
Parker Creek
Skookum Creek
Barr Creek
Mill Creek
Ginkgo Creek
Coffee Creek
Dead Soldier Creek
North Fork Mill Creek
Pipeline Creek
Schoolma'am Creek
Graham Creek
Lund Creek
Deep Creek
Larson Creek
Kiter Creek
Needle Creek
Cedar Creek
Jim Creek
Hop Creek
Top Creek
Littlemile Creek
Abbott Creek
Woodruff Creek
Little Sunshine Creek
Red Fir Creek
Sunshine Creek
McCall Creek
North Fork Abbott Creek
West Fork Abbott Creek
DeWitt Creek
Flat Creek
Travail Creek
Union Creek
Crawford Creek
Grouse Creek
Castle Creek
North Fork Castle Creek
Little Castle Creek
Trapper Creek
Dutton Creek
Bybee Creek
Rock Creek
Deer Creek
Browns Creek
Bridge Creek
Prairie Creek
Foster Creek
Hershberger Creek
Rabbitear Creek
Wiley Creek
Log Creek
Copeland Creek
North Fork Copeland Creek
Middle Fork Copeland Creek
South Fork Copeland Creek
Wizard Creek
Crater Creek
Bert Creek
Bill Creek
National Creek
Falls Creek
Beartree Creek
South Fork National Creek
Middle Fork National Creek
Lost Creek
Meadow Creek
Hurryon Creek
Muir Creek
Rock Creek
Alkali Creek
East Fork Muir Creek
Sherwood Creek
Ice Creek
West Fork Muir Creek
Hamaker Creek
Minnehaha Creek
Mazama Creek
Cascade Creek
Riley Creek
North Fork Riley Creek
Middle Fork Riley Creek
South Fork Riley Creek
Cunniff Creek
East Fork Cunniff Creek
West Fork Cunniff Creek
Thompson Creek
Antone Creek
Hunter Creek
Turner Creek
Taylor Creek
Yorke Creek
Smith Creek
Crossen Creek
Conn Creek
Hafner Creek
Little South Fork Hunter Creek
Big South Fork Hunter Creek
North Fork Hunter Creek
Elko Creek
Daniels Creek
Egans Creek
Myers Creek
North Fork Myers Creek
Pistol River
McKinley Creek
Crook Creek
Glade Creek
Deep Creek
South Fork Pistol River
Sunrise Creek
North Fork Pistol River
East Fork Pistol River
Meadow Creek
Sand Creek
Hidden Creek
Burnt Hill Creek
Whiskey Creek
Hooskanaden Creek
Miner Creek
Wridge Creek
Dunning Creek
Horse Prairie Creek
Spruce Creek
China Creek
Thomas Creek
Bruces Bones Creek
Whalehead Creek
South Fork Whalehead Creek
Coon Creek
Bowman Creek
House Rock Creek
Lone Ranch Creek
Duley Creek
Ram Creek
Taylor Creek
Shy Creek
Harris Creek
Eiler Creek
Ransom Creek
Macklyn Creek
Chetco River
North Fork Chetco River
South Fork Chetco River
Boulder Creek
Tincup Creek
Box Canyon Creek
Babyfoot Creek
Little Chetco River
Henry Creek
Ditch Creek
Copper Creek
Henry Creek
Tuttle Creek
Stack Creek
O'Loughlin Gulch
Johnson Creek
McVay Creek
Cooley Creek
Winchuck River
→ North Fork Smith River (originates in Oregon and drains into Smith River in California)
Stony Creek
Still Creek
Diamond Creek
Cedar Creek
Fall Creek
Baldface Creek
Packsaddle Creek
Hardrock Creek
Chrome Creek
Horse Creek
Klamath River (enters the Pacific Ocean in California)
Lost River
Link River
Wood River
Crooked Creek
Fort Creek
Annie Creek
Sun Creek
Vidae Creek
East Fork
Middle Fork
Pole Bridge Creek
Munson Creek
Goodbye Creek
Fourmile Creek
Seldom Creek
Lost Creek
Long Creek
Horse Creek
Swan Creek
Recreation Creek
Crystal Creek
Rock Creek
Penn Creek
Thomason Creek
West Fork Thomason Creek
Fourmile Creek
Crane Creek
Threemile Creek
Cherry Creek
Nannie Creek
Sevenmile Creek
Short Creek
Williamson River
Sprague River
Sycan River
Snake Creek
Blue Creek
Merritt Creek
Long Creek
Paradise Creek
Currier Creek
Skull Creek
Rifle Creek
Cummings Creek
Nixon Creek
Kelly Creek
Rock Creek
South Fork Sycan River
Boulder Creek
North Fork Sprague River
South Fork Sprague River

Alvord Lake
List is of rivers that flow into Alvord Lake, a lake with no outflows.
Wildhorse Creek
Miranda Creek
Juniper Creek
Buttes Creek
Andrews Creek
Wilson Creek
Spring Creek
Stonehouse Creek
Deppy Creek
Willow Spring Creek
Willow Creek
Little Wildhorse Creek

Carter Lake
List is of rivers that flow into Carter Lake, a lake with no outflows.
Carter Lake Creek

Cleawox Lake
List is of rivers that flow into Cleawox Lake, a lake with no outflows.
Buck Creek

Hart Lake
List is of rivers that flow into Hart Lake, a lake with no outflows. Order of mouths is alphabetical while tributary structures are of increasing distance from the mouth.
Deep Creek
Squaw Creek
Drake Creek
Parsnip Creek
Peddlers Creek
Camas Creek
Sage Hen Creek
Crane Creek
Little Parsnip Creek
Blue Creek
Mud Creek
Porcupine Creek
Horse Creek
Burnt Creek
Willow Creek
Polander Creek
Dismal Creek
North Fork Deep Creek
Middle Fork Deep Creek
Mosquito Creek
South Fork Deep Creek
Honey Creek
Twelvemile Creek
McDowell Creek
Suipe Creek
North Fork McDowell Creek
South Fork McDowell Creek
Deppy Creek
Snyder Creek
Colvin Creek
South Fork Snyder Creek
Clover Creek
Dent Creek
Little Honey Creek
First Swale Creek
Second Swale Creek
Long John Creek
Sage Creek

Lake Abert
List is of rivers that flow into Lake Abert, a lake with no outflows. Order of tributary structure is of increasing distance from the mouth.
Chewaucan River
Crooked Creek
Moss Creek
Jones Creek
Dicks Creek
Loveless Creek
Parker Creek
Little Cove Creek
Big Cove Creek
North Fork Crooked Creek
South Fork Crooked Creek
Middle Fork Crooked Creek

Lake Marie
List is of rivers that flow into Lake Marie, a lake with no outflows.
Marie Creek

Malheur Lake
List is of rivers that flow into Malheur Lake, a lake with no outflows. Order of mouths is alphabetical while tributary structures are of increasing distance from the mouth.
Donner und Blitzen River
Swamp Creek
Kiger Creek
Cucamonga Creek
Poison Creek
Little Kiger Creek
Mud Creek
Big Pasture Creek
Little Blitzen River
East Fork Silvies River
West Fork Silvies River
Silvies River

Quinn River Sink (Nevada)
List is of rivers in Oregon that drain into Nevada's Quinn River, which drains into the Quinn River Sink in the Black Rock Desert, also in Nevada. Order is by increasing distance from the mouth of the Quinn River.
Kings River
East Fork Quinn River

Summer Lake
List is of rivers that flow into Summer Lake, a lake with no outflows.
Ana River

See also 

List of canals in Oregon (A-L) and List of canals in Oregon (M-Z)
List of lakes in Oregon
List of longest streams of Oregon
List of National Wild and Scenic Rivers#Oregon
Lists of Oregon-related topics
List of rivers in the United States
List of rivers of the Americas by coastline
List of shoals of Oregon

External links

List
Oregon rivers
Rivers
Rivers